Tennis at the 2014 Summer Youth Olympics was held from 17 to 24 August at the Nanjing Sport Institute in Nanjing, China.

Qualification 
Each National Olympic Committee (NOC) can enter a maximum of 4 competitors, 2 per each gender. As hosts, China is given 2 quotas, 1 per each gender should they not qualify normally, however they normally qualified two female athletes and chose not to use their male quota and a further 6 competitors, 3 per each gender will be decided by the Tripartite Commission. Only four of those spots were used, the other two were reallocated to the World Junior rankings. The remaining 56 places shall be decided by the ATP rankings, WTA rankings and ITF World Junior rankings update on 9 June 2014. The first 12 spots per each gender will go to any eligible athlete ranked in the top 450 in the ATP rankings for boys and the top 200 in the WTA rankings for girls. Should any spots remain they will be reallocated to the top ranked athletes in the ITF World Junior rankings. The remaining 16 spots per each gender will be broken down into zones and given to the next best ranked athlete in the ITF World Junior rankings.

To be eligible to participate at the Youth Olympics athletes must have been born between 1 January 1996 and 31 December 1999. Furthermore, all qualified players will take place in the doubles and mixed doubles events.

Boys

Girls

Schedule 
The schedule was released by the Nanjing Youth Olympic Games Organizing Committee.

All times are CST (UTC+8)

Medal summary

Medal table 

 Note: Medals for mixed teams have not been counted towards their individual nation.

Events

References

External links
Official Results Book – Tennis

 
2014 Summer Youth Olympics events
Youth Summer Olympics
2014
Tennis tournaments in China